This is a list of twice Heroes of Socialist Labour; 201 people were double holders of the title. This list does not include individuals who were awarded the title additional times or stripped of it.

References

Further reading 

 Газета «Правда» № 58 (14452) от 27 февраля 1958 года
 Большая советская энциклопедия : [в 30 т.] / гл. ред. А. М. Прохоров. — 3-е изд. — М. : Советская энциклопедия, 1969—1978.
 М. В. Музалевский, А. Л. Дёмин. Герои Социалистического Труда. — М.: «Кавалеръ», 2007. — Т. 1. — 230 с.

Civil awards and decorations of the Soviet Union
Awards established in 1938
Awards disestablished in 1991
Honorary titles of the Soviet Union
Business and industry awards